Jaime Cárdenas Gracia (born 17 February 1960) is a Mexican politician from the Labor Party. From 2009 to 2012 he served as Deputy of the LXI Legislature of the Mexican Congress representing the Federal District.

References

1960 births
Living people
Politicians from Coahuila
National Autonomous University of Mexico alumni
Members of the Chamber of Deputies (Mexico)
Labor Party (Mexico) politicians
21st-century Mexican politicians